Channa Mereya is an Indian Hindi-language romantic drama television series that premiered on 5 July 2022 on Star Bharat. It digitally streams on Disney+Hotstar. Produced by Yash A Patnaik and Mamta Patnaik under the banner Beyond Dreams Entertainment, it stars Niyati Fatnani and Karan Wahi. The show went off air on 12 November 2022.

Plot
The story actually revolves around the love for cooking and based on the culture of Punjab. Ginni Garewal  is a 24-year-old girl who is full of life. She lives in her own little bubble of chaos and is desperate for a resolution for her family problems and the missing feeling of love. Ginni and her family run a Dhaba in Amritsar. On the other hand, Aditya Singh is a 27-year-old guy who aspires to be one of the world's highest hoteliers. He is on a quest for significance and meaning in his life, and he finds the answers in a girl he despises. But then decides to fall in love with her , not knowing his mother is still alive . He marries Ginni. There lives are then set after 1 year she falls pregnant with Aditya's child. While Aditya is having an affair, but when Ginni finds out is just a sharade to find his mother . While Ginni helps him out to execute his plan her water breaks. And she delivers a baby boy .. And they live happily ever after

Cast

Main
 Niyati Fatnani as Ginni Aditya Raj Singh (née Garewal): Khushwant and Gulraj's daughter; Goldie, Dimpy and Shampy's sister; Aditya's wife
 Karan Wahi as Aditya Raj Singh: Amber and Gurkirat's son; Supreet's step-son; Akash's half- brother; Rajwant's grandson, Ginni's husband 
 Swarnim Neema as Child Aditya Singh

Recurring
 Puneet Issar as Rajwant Singh aka Daarji: Anand and Amber's father; Aditya, Gurleen, Marleen and Akash's grandfather
 Shakti Anand as Amber Singh: Gurkirat's widower; Supreet's husband; Aditya and Akash's father
 Vishavpreet Kaur as Supreet Amber Singh: Amber's second wife; Akash's mother; Aditya's stepmother
 Perneet Chauhan as Gurkirat Amber Singh: Amber's first wife; Aditya's mother (Dead)
 Tanushree Kaushal as Gurraj Garewal: Khushwant's widow; Ginni, Goldie, Dimpy and Shampy's mother
 Kanwalpreet Singh as Goldie Garewal: Khushwant and Gurraj's; Ginni, Dimpy and Shampy's brother; Simranpreet's husband 
 Charu Mehra as Simranpreet Goldie Garewal / Sam Dhillon: Goldie's wife; Aditya's obsessed lover 
 Harpal Singh Sokhi as Khushwant Garewal: Ginni and Goldie, Shampy and Dimpy's father; Gurraj's late husband (Dead)
 Shardul Pandit as Armaan: Aditya's best friend
 Aashish Kaul as Anand Singh: Shailaja's husband; Gurleen and Marleen's father; Amber's elder brother
 Mamta Verma as Shailaja Anand Singh: Anand's wife; Gurleen and Marleen's mother
 Aanya Rawal as Dimpy Garewal: Khushwant and Gurraj's daughter; Ginni and Goldie's younger sister; Shampy's twin sister
 Jasleen Singh as Shampy Garewal: Khushwant and Gurraj's daughter; Ginni and Goldie's younger brother; Dimpy's twin brother
 Dhriti Goenka as Gurleen Cheema (née Singh): Anand and Shailaja's daughter; Rajwant's granddaughter; Marleen's sister; Aditya and Akash's cousin; Harjeet's wife
 Dhantejas Pandit as Child Akash Singh: Amber and Supreet's son; Aditya's younger half-brother; Rajwant's grandson
 Chirag Bhanot as Harjeet Cheema: Gurleen's husband
 Sonika Gill as Sonia: Rajwant's friend 
 Sanjana Solanki as Marleen Singh: Anand and Shailaja's daughter; Rajwant's granddaughter; Gurleen's sister; Aditya and Akash's cousin
 Aradhana Sharma as Harnaaz Cheema: Aditya's ex-prospective bride
 Nisha Gupta as Ginni's friend
 Aashi Mickey

Production

Development
The show's title is based on the song "Channa Mereya" sung by Arijit Singh from the 2016 film Ae Dil Hai Mushkil. The shooting of the series began in May 2022.

Casting 
Niyati Fatnani and Karan Wahi were cast as the main leads.

Cancellation 
The series went off-air on 12 November 2022, in an unprofessional manner due to low viewership without any prior notice by the channel Star Bharat. Karan Wahi, Niyati Fatnani and the whole cast were completely disappointed because of the abrupt end.

Reception

Critical reception
Channa Mereya received mixed to positive reviews from critics. Gayatri Nirmal of Pinkvilla stated "Channa Mereya is a decent watch and brings along a dash of freshness. Niyati Fatnani's optimism & Karan Wahi's rage grips viewers."

Awards and nominations

See also
List of programs broadcast by Star Bharat

References

External links
 Channa Mereya on Disney+ Hotstar
 

2022 Indian television series debuts
Hindi-language television shows
Indian drama television series
Indian television soap operas
Star Bharat original programming